Arthur C. Clarke's Mysterious Universe is a popular 26-part television series looking at unexplained phenomena across the universe. It was first broadcast in the United Kingdom by independent television network Discovery Channel. It premiered on 15 July 1994. It was the sequel to Arthur C. Clarke's Mysterious World and Arthur C. Clarke's World of Strange Powers.

The series is introduced by acclaimed science fiction writer Arthur C. Clarke in short sequences filmed at his home in Sri Lanka, with individual episodes narrated by Carol Vorderman. The series was produced by John Fairley and directed by Peter Jones, Michael Weigall and Charles Flynn.

Episodes
Arthur C. Clarke's Mysterious Universe consisted of 26 episodes.

Home release
Arthur C. Clarke's Mysterious Universe was released on DVD on 11 March 2003.

A collection DVD Box Set of all three Arthur C. Clarke documentary series, Arthur C. Clarke's Mysterious World, Arthur C. Clarke's World of Strange Powers and Arthur C. Clarke's Mysterious Universe was released in July 2013 by Visual Entertainment, which also re-released them separately in September 2013.

References

External links

Arthur C. Clarke's Mysterious Universe at Amazon

1994 British television series debuts
1995 British television series endings
1990s British documentary television series
Television series by Arthur C. Clarke
Discovery Channel original programming
ITV documentaries
Paranormal television
Television series by ITV Studios
Television series by Yorkshire Television
English-language television shows
1990s British mystery television series